Hangtown fry is a type of omelette made famous during the California Gold Rush in the 1850s. The most common version includes bacon and oysters combined with eggs, and fried together.

History

The dish was invented in Placerville, California, then known as Hangtown. According to most accounts, the dish was invented when a gold prospector struck it rich, headed to the Cary House Hotel, and demanded the most expensive dish that the kitchen could provide. The most expensive ingredients available were eggs, which were delicate and had to be carefully brought to the mining town; bacon, which was shipped from the East Coast; and oysters, which had to be brought on ice from San Francisco, over 100 miles away.

Another creation myth is the one told by the waiters at Sam's Grill in Tiburon, just north of San Francisco. At the county jail in Placerville, a condemned man was asked what he would like to eat for his last meal. He thought quickly and ordered an oyster omelet, knowing that the oysters would have to be brought from the water, over a hundred miles away by steamship and over rough roads, delaying his execution for a day.

The dish was popularized by Tadich Grill in San Francisco, where it has apparently been on the menu for 160 years. Later variations on the dish include the addition of onions, bell peppers, or various spices, and deep frying the oysters before adding them to the omelette.

According to the El Dorado County Museum, "No dish epitomizes California and its Gold Rush more than Hangtown Fry. It was created at a location central to the Gold Rush at the same time the great state was being born. And, like the miners who worked the river banks and hillsides, and the population that followed, it is a unique blend of many things, both those produced locally and those that have arrived from elsewhere."

In the 1962 episode, "The Hangtown Fry" of the syndicated television anthology series, Death Valley Days, hosted by Stanley Andrews, Fabrizio Mioni was cast as Paul Duval, a young man falsely condemned to the gallows in Placerville when the community was known as "Hangtown." In the story line, Duval orders a made-up recipe of bacon and oysters in the form of an egg omelette in hopes of postponing his execution while his girlfriend, Ann Alton (Nancy Rennick), frantically seeks information to clear him. Helen Kleeb played Ann's mother. The recipe is still available in some California restaurants.  Three versions are included in Booth Seafood Co's compendium of James Beard's 1954 seafood cookbook.

Variations
Food writer and chef Mark Bittman created his own version of Hangtown Fry in one of his Minimalist cooking videos for The New York Times.

See also

 List of egg dishes

References

American cuisine
Omelettes
Oyster dishes
Food and drink in California
Food and drink introduced in the 1850s
American seafood dishes
American breakfast foods